Nymphicula adelphalis is a moth in the family Crambidae. It was described by David John Lawrence Agassiz in 2014. It is found in Australia, where it has been recorded from the Northern Territory.

The wingspan is about 14 mm. The base of the forewing is brown on the costa and orange on the dorsum. The subbasal fascia are white and the antemedian fascia are orange. The base of the hindwings is white. The subbasal fascia are brown and the antemedian fascia are orange. There are several silver spots.

Etymology
The species name refers to the close relationship with other species and is derived from the Greek word for brother.

References

Nymphicula
Moths described in 2014